Sarah Anne Nixey (born 21 December 1973 in Dorset, England) is an English singer-songwriter, best known as the vocalist in Black Box Recorder. Her debut solo album, Sing, Memory, was released on 19 February 2007, followed by Brave Tin Soldiers, released on 9 May 2011.  Her latest album, Night Walks, was released on 5 October 2018. Nixey currently lives in London with her husband, music producer Jimmy Hogarth, whom she married in late 2010 and has one son, Reuben (born late 2007) and a daughter, Lola (born late 2012). Nixey has a daughter, Ava (born 2001) from her previous marriage with John Moore.

Biography 

Nixey's mother has said that she knew that her daughter would become a vocalist since she was merely a baby.

Whilst working as a backing vocalist for the folk band Balloon, Nixey was approached by John Moore (who had been the drummer for The Jesus and Mary Chain) and Luke Haines (frontman of The Auteurs), who had formed a duo and were looking for a vocalist. The duo convinced Nixey to join them by promising her that she would become famous, and in 1998, Black Box Recorder released their first album, England Made Me to critical acclaim.

Their second album, The Facts of Life, followed in 2000, and spawned a top 20 single of the same name, which saw the group perform on BBC's Top of the Pops. A further single followed, and in 2001, Nixey married John Moore, and they had a daughter together (Nixey and Moore divorced in 2006). In 2003, Black Box Recorder released their third album, Passionoia; their first and only album for One Little Indian records, following the demise of Nude Records.

In 2004, Black Box Recorder went on hiatus; not officially splitting, but with all three members deciding to pursue solo projects. In late 2005, Nixey announced she was working on a solo album, to be produced and co-written by James Banbury (a producer, programmer, writer and string arranger, as well as former member of The Auteurs). In mid-2006, two songs were made available on legal download services, entitled "The Collector" and "Love & Exile". A third song was made available in September, entitled "Strangelove", backed by remixes of "The Collector". Nixey's debut full-length solo album, entitled Sing, Memory, was released on 19 February 2007, following the release of her third single, "When I'm Here With You", which was released on 29 January 2007, backed with non-album track, "Watching Over You". Drowned in Sound awarded Sing, Memory 8/10 and MusicOMH gave it 4 stars. The album was given 7/10 by the NME and 6.3 by Pitchfork

In December 2007, Black Box Recorder teamed up with Art Brut to create the single "Christmas Number One" under the collaborative title of The Black Arts.

In October 2008 Black Box Recorder appeared at the Nick Sanderson (Earl Brutus) tribute concert. It was subsequently announced that the band would play their first headlining gig for five years at The Luminaire, Kilburn, London in February 2009.  They then played their last gig at Queen Elizabeth Hall, London's Southbank, on 23 July 2009.  A final statement was issued just prior to the 2010 UK general election stating ″on Thursday 6 May, Black Box Recorder go to the country for the last time″. Their last two recordings were "Do You Believe in God?" and "Keep It in the Family", and are available as a download.

Nixey appeared as a guest vocalist on the track "Water Drops on Burning Rocks" on the autumn 2009 EP Blips Don't Lie by American electronic duo Microfilm as well as appearing on their 2013 third album AggroPastels  providing vocals for the tracks "Pretty Revolutionaries" and "Penthouse." She will also feature on their fourth studio album to be released in 2015.

In April 2011, it was announced that Nixey had written and produced a new album, Brave Tin Soldiers to be released 9 May 2011 on her own label Black Lead. The press release described the album as such: "lush piano, string and choral arrangements envelop her vocal which reveals family secrets, erotic entanglements and tragic love stories".  A week prior to the album, Brave Tin Soldiers EP was released with remixes by dadahack and Kids Love. The Freelance Hellraiser also released a bootleg mix entitled Brave Tin Lovers.

The album Brave Tin Soldiers was given four stars by The Sunday Times and Scottish Sunday Express, very favourable reviews in The Independent and Uncut and radio support from BBC Radio 6 Music.  Following this, on 18 July 2011 The Homecoming EP was released with remixes by Microfilm and Kids Love, plus a further reworking of Black Rose by Half Cousin.  A music video was also made available via YouTube, directed and produced by Black Lead Films.  Later that year "Nixey's Merry Christmas" single was released on 12 December 2011 with accompanying music video on YouTube.  

The seductive third and final single from Brave Tin Soldiers was released on 23 April 2012.  Silk Threads EP included remixes by Kids Love and Microfilm and a B-side "Devil's Playground".  Subsequently, a music video for the single was published on YouTube.  Towards the end of that year, Nixey released another alternative seasonal anthem, "Christmas Without You", with radio support from BBC Radio 6 music.

Discography

Black Box Recorder

Singles
"Child Psychology" – 1998
"England Made Me" – 1998
"The Facts of Life" (UK #20) – 2000
"The Art of Driving" – 2000
"These Are The Things" – 2003
"The School Song" – 2003

Albums
England Made Me – 1998
The Facts of Life (UK #37) – 2000
The Worst of Black Box Recorder – 2001
Passionoia – 2003

Solo

Singles
"The Collector" Single (download only) – 2005
"Strangelove" EP (7" vinyl & CD) – 2006
"The Collector" Remixes EP (download only) – 2006
"When I'm Here With You" (download only) – 2007
"The Black Hit of Space" (download only) – 2007
"Le Temps de L'Amour" (download only) – 2008
"Brave Tin Soldier" EP (download only) – 2 May 2011
"The Homecoming" EP (download only) – 18 July 2011
"Coming Up For Air" EP (download only) – 13 July 2018
"The Zeppelin" EP (download only) – 14 September 2018
"Dancing At The Edge Of The World" EP (download only) – 21 December 2018

Albums
Sing, Memory (CD and download) – 17 February 2007
Brave Tin Soldiers (CD and download) – 9 May 2011
Night Walks (CD, Vinyl and download) – 5 October 2018

References

External links

1973 births
Living people
English women singer-songwriters
English women in electronic music
English women pop singers